Rolvsøy or Rolvsøya is an island in Måsøy Municipality in Troms og Finnmark county, Norway. The  island has a population (2001) of 72. The island is located south of the island of Ingøya and north and west of the mainland, separated by the Rolvsøysundet.

Almost all settlements are on the island's northern part. On the west side lies the fishing village of Tufjord and on the eastern side is the seaside village of Gunnarnes where there is a ferry connection to the villages of Havøysund and Ingøy. Gunnarnes Chapel is located on the east side of the island.

See also
List of islands of Norway

References

Måsøy
Islands of Troms og Finnmark